Robert Oliver may refer to:

 Robert Oliver (canoeist) (born 1988), British Paralympic canoeist
 Robert Oliver (chef),  New Zealand chef, raised in Fiji and Samoa
 Robert Oliver (cyclist) (born 1950), New Zealand road and track cyclist
 Robert Oliver (priest) (1710–1784), Archdeacon of the East Riding
 Robert Oliver (soldier) (1738–1810), American Revolutionary War lieutenant colonel and politician
 Robert Don Oliver (1895–1980), British Royal Navy officer
 Robert Dudley Oliver (1766–1850), British Royal Navy officer
 Robert Shaw Oliver (1847–1935), United States Assistant Secretary of War
 Robert T. Oliver (1909–2000), American author, lecturer, and authority on public speaking
 Robert W. Oliver (1815–1899), first Chancellor of the University of Kansas
 Robert Oliver, founding director of Baltimore and Ohio Railroad

See also
 Bob Oliver (1943-2020), American baseball player
 Bob Oliver (American football) (1947–2013), American football player